Charles McBurney may refer to:

Charles McBurney (archaeologist) (1914–1979), American archaeologist
Charles McBurney (politician) (born 1957), member of the House of Representatives for Florida
Charles McBurney (surgeon) (1845–1913), American surgeon who described McBurney's point

See also
Charles Burney